

Benjamin Berry Banks (born April 4, 1932) has been a general authority of  The Church of Jesus Christ of Latter-day Saints (LDS Church) since 1989. He was a member of the seven-man Presidency of the Seventy from 1999 to 2002 and has also been president of the church's Jordan River Utah Temple.

Banks was born on April 4, 1932 in Salt Lake City, Utah to Ben F. Banks and Chloa Berry Banks. His father died when Ben was two years old.

LDS Church service
Before becoming a general authority, Banks served in the church as a stake president and bishop. From 1987 to 1989 he was president of the church's Scotland Edinburgh Mission.

On April 1, 1989, Banks became a member of the Second Quorum of the Seventy; he was transferred to the First Quorum of the Seventy in 1992. As a general authority, Banks served as an Assistant Director of the church's Historical Department. He was president of the church's Utah South Area during the late 1990s. In 1997, Banks presided at the groundbreaking for the Monticello Utah Temple.

In 2002, Banks was designated as an emeritus general authority and became president of the Jordan River Utah Temple, where he served until 2005.

Personal life
Banks married Susan Kearnes and they have eight children. In September 2005, Banks and his wife became the directors of Church Hosting.

See also
2008 Deseret Morning News Church Almanac (Salt Lake City, Utah: Deseret Morning News, 2007), p. 89

References

External links
Elder Ben B. Banks of the Second Quorum of the Seventy
Grampa Bill's G.A. Pages: Ben B. Banks

1932 births
American general authorities (LDS Church)
American Mormon missionaries in Scotland
Living people
Mission presidents (LDS Church)
People from Salt Lake City
Temple presidents and matrons (LDS Church)
20th-century Mormon missionaries
Presidents of the Seventy (LDS Church)
Members of the Second Quorum of the Seventy (LDS Church)
Members of the First Quorum of the Seventy (LDS Church)